James Haskell Hope (September 22, 1874 – January 18, 1952) was the longest-serving Superintendent of Education in the state of South Carolina, from 1922 until 1945.

Friends called him "Bud." In 1925, Hope and his siblings J.J. Hope and Mary Hope Hipp paid for and donated  of land to the Rosenwald Fund. This became the Hope Rosenwald School.  James Hope is known for his defending of the rights of African Americans before and during his term in office.

Hope Station 

James Haskell Hope was born in Hope Station, the tract of land that Hope's German ancestor had built and maintained.  It was called Hope Station because of the local train station called by the same name. Hope Station began as a stopping point on the old Greenville and Columbia Railroad, built around 1850. The line also included stops in Peak, Pomaria, Prosperity, Newberry and Silverstreet.

Colleges and clubs 

Class of 1896 Clemson Agricultural College
Master's degree at Newberry College
Free Masons
Wardlaw Club
Democratic Club

Superintendent of Education 

Hope was elected to be the South Carolina Superintendent of Education in 1922.  During Hope's reign, African-Americans were awarded high school diplomas for the very first time.  Also, a teacher retirement plan was created, an attendance law was passed, and the 12th grade was introduced in South Carolina.  James Haskell Hope was a member of the Democratic Party.

External links 

South Carolina Department of Education(James Haskell Hope) Website
 http://ed.sc.gov/agency/superintendent/former/hope/james_hope.html

References

South Carolina Superintendent of Education
Clemson University alumni
Newberry College alumni
1874 births
1952 deaths
People from Pomaria, South Carolina